Natalie is a 1976 album by American singer Natalie Cole. Cole's second studio album, It was released on April 9, 1976, by Capitol Records. The album features the hit singles, "Sophisticated Lady (She's a Different Lady)" and "Mr. Melody". The track, "Sophisticated Lady (She's a Different Lady)" peaked at No. 1 on Billboard's Hot R&B Singles and No. 25 on the Billboard Hot 100 Charts.

Track listing

Personnel
 Natalie Cole – lead vocals, backing vocals
 Tennyson Stephens – keyboards
 Marvin Yancy – keyboards, arrangements (3, 4, 5, 9, 10)
 Cash McCall – guitar
 Joseph "Lucky" Scott – bass guitar
 Quinton Joseph – drums
 Henry Gibson – percussion
 Chuck Jackson – percussion, arrangements (3, 5, 9, 10)
 Richard Evans – arrangements (1-5, 7)
 Gene Barge – arrangements (3, 6, 8, 9, 10)

Production
 Producers – Chuck Jackson and Marvin Yancy  (Tracks 1, 2 & 4–10); Gene Barge and Richard Evans (Track 3).
 Executive Producer – Larkin Arnold
 Engineers – Roger Anfinsen and Fred Brietberg
 Mastered by Wally Traugott at Capitol Studios (Hollywood, CA).
 Art Direction – Roy Kohara
 Photography – Charles W. Bush
 Management – Kevin Hunter

Charts

Singles

Certifications

References

External links
 Natalie at Discogs

1976 albums
Natalie Cole albums
Capitol Records albums